The Prescott School at Third and Main in Prescott in Linn County, Kansas, also known as the old Prescott School, was built in 1882–83 with Italianate style.  It was listed on the National Register of Historic Places in 1982.

The building was wired for electricity in 1924. Its coal-burning stoves were used until 1956 when gas heating was installed. It was modified by the addition of an entry hall in 1949 but that was removed in 1980. It was modified by the relocation and attachment of rural schoolhouses in 1953 and 1958, but those were removed in 1956.

As of 1982, a 1924 high school nearby served as an elementary school.

References

School buildings on the National Register of Historic Places in Kansas
Italianate architecture in Kansas
School buildings completed in 1882
Schools in Kansas
Linn County, Kansas